Robert Boswell is an American short story writer and novelist.   He has been faculty at the Bread Loaf Writers' Conference.

He shares the Cullen Chair in Creative Writing at the University of Houston with his wife, Antonya Nelson. Boswell teaches creative writing at the University of Houston.

Works
 , 2008
 City Bus, published in Ploughshares, Spring 2004

Short Stories

Novels
 
 
 
  (published under the pseudonym Shale Aaron)

Nonfiction
 
  A book about a real-life treasure hunt in New Mexico (co-written with David Schweidel).

Play
 Tongues

References

External links

Living people
American male writers
American male short story writers
American short story writers
New Mexico State University faculty
University of Arizona alumni
University of Houston faculty
1953 births